The 2005 UCI Cyclo-cross World Championships were held in Sankt Wendel, Germany from Saturday January 29 to Sunday January 30, 2005.

Medal summary

Medal table

Men's Elite
 Held on Sunday January 30, 2005

Men's Juniors
 Held on Saturday January 29, 2005

Men's Espoirs
 Held on Saturday January 29, 2005

Women's Elite
 Held on Sunday January 30, 2005

External links
 Sports123
 CyclingNews

UCI Cyclo-cross World Championships
World Championships
C
International cycle races hosted by Germany
January 2005 sports events in Europe